ReadyLink was a "walkie-talkie" service, which used Session Initiation Protocol (SIP), offered by the Sprint Nextel Corporation, in an effort to compete with then-separate Nextel Communications. It was necessary to have a Sanyo or a Samsung ReadyLink capable phone and a matching service-plan in order to use this feature. ReadyLink sought to mimic the forerunning "MOTO Talk"/Nextel walkie-talkie service, except that ReadyLink was created to operate on the Sprint CDMA network. 
It was discontinued shortly after the Sprint PCS acquisition of Nextel Communications.

Sprint has replaced Readylink with Qualcomm's QChat. This technology will run over the Sprint high-speed EV-DO data network, giving it the closest comparable speeds to Motorola's iDEN Direct-Connect in the push-to-talk industry.

In Canada, the Bell Mobility network (including Aliant and SaskTel Mobility) implements similar technology with their 10-4 service. Some of the same phones are available, and Bell subscribers can roam with the service on Sprint's network.

Phones with ReadyLink:
Samsung
Samsung SPH-A640
Samsung SPH-A760
Samsung SPH-A820
Sanyo
Sanyo M1
Sanyo MM-5600
Sanyo MM-5660
Sanyo MM-7400
Sanyo MM-7500
Sanyo MM-8300
Sanyo MM-9000
Sanyo PM-8200
Sanyo RL-2000
Sanyo RL-2500
Sanyo RL-4920
Sanyo RL-4930
Sanyo RL-7300
Sanyo SCP-2400
Sanyo SCP-3100
Sanyo SCP-3200
Sanyo SCP-7000
Sanyo SCP-7300
Sanyo SCP-8400
Sanyo VI-2300
Sanyo VM-4500

External links
Official Readylink site - on Sprintpcs.com
Information on Bell Mobility's 10-4 - on Bell.ca

References

Sprint Corporation